Happy Anniversary is a Bollywood comedy film produced by Gaurang Doshi and directed by Prahlad Kakkar. The film is a romantic drama which was to be released in 2016. The film has Abhishek Bachchan in lead playing Aishwarya's husband, deals with marital issues. Sushant Singh Rajput plays an artist in the movie while Jassi Gill and Amyra Dastur play a dysfunctional Punjabi couple. Rhea Chakraborty will play a kindergarten teacher.

Cast
 Sushant Singh Rajput as Kunal Mehra 
 Abhishek Bachchan as Rohan Solanki
 Rhea Chakraborty as Rhea Solanki, Rohan's sister
 Amyra Dastur as Anamika
 Jassi Gill as Nikhil Mehra, Kunal's brother
 Aishwarya Rai Bachchan as Aisha Solanki, Rohan's wife
 Amitabh Bachchan as Sanjay Mehra, Kunal's father
 Sushmita Sen as Shreya Solanki, Rhea and Rohan's sister

References

Unreleased Hindi-language films
Indian drama films
2010s Hindi-language films
Films scored by Bickram Ghosh